Aviolet is a Serbian regional airline headquartered in Belgrade. It is a fully owned subsidiary of Air Serbia and mostly operates international charter flights from Serbia.

History
The airline was founded on 24 May 2014 as a subsidiary of Air Serbia. Most flights depart from Belgrade's Nikola Tesla Airport, and are carried out by aircraft and crews of Air Serbia.

Destinations

As of May 2019, Aviolet serves 26 destinations (all seasonal charter flights):

Codeshare agreements
Aviolet additionally maintains codeshare agreements with parent company Air Serbia.

Fleet

Current fleet

As of May 2019, the Aviolet fleet consists of the following aircraft:

References

External links

Official website

Serbian brands
Airlines established in 2014
Airlines of Serbia
Companies based in Belgrade
Air Serbia
Serbian companies established in 2014